United Air Lines Flight 553 was a scheduled flight from Washington National Airport to Omaha, Nebraska, via Chicago Midway International Airport. On December 8, 1972, the Boeing 737-222 serving the flight, City of Lincoln, registration  crashed during an aborted landing and go around while approaching Midway Airport.

The plane crashed into a residential neighborhood, destroying five houses; there was an intense ground fire. 43 of the 61 aboard the aircraft and two on the ground  Among the passengers killed were Illinois congressman George W. Collins, CBS News correspondent Michele Clark and Dorothy Hunt, the wife of Watergate conspirator E. Howard Hunt. This crash was the first fatal accident involving a Boeing 737, which had entered airline service nearly five years earlier in February 1968.

Crew
United Air Lines Flight 553 was a scheduled service from Washington National Airport to Omaha, Nebraska, via Chicago Midway International Airport.  used for the flight was a four-year-old Boeing 737-222, City of Lincoln, registration  (built in 1968).

First Officer Coble had more than 10,600 flight hours (including nearly 1,700 hours on the Boeing 737) under his belt and Second Officer Elder had close to 2,700 hours, with nearly 1,200 of them on the Boeing 737.

Accident
The accident occurred as the aircraft was on a northwesterly heading to land on runway 31L at Midway Airport. The area was overcast at the time: a pilot landing on that runway immediately after the accident later reported that the airport was only visible below  Flight 553 was on instruments, cleared by air traffic control at 14:24 CST for a nonprecision approach.

The localizer approach for runway 31L used an Outer Marker Beacon (OMB) named "Kedzie", located  prior to the runway threshold. Under the published landing procedures, the aircraft was to maintain a minimum altitude of  until it passed the OMB, at which point the flight was allowed to descend to a minimum descent altitude (MDA) of  Published procedures, and pilots operating under instrument flight rules, use mean sea level (MSL) as the point of reference for measuring altitude; at Midway Airport, an altitude of  corresponded to an actual height above ground level (AGL) of only 

The captain leveled the plane off and increased engine power, but did not advance the throttles fully. With the spoilers still extended, thrust was not enough to maintain level flight without losing speed. The stick shaker, a stall warning device attached to the pilots' control yoke, activated 6–7 seconds after the aircraft leveled off and continued to sound as the aircraft entered an aerodynamic stall.

Victims 
The three-man flight crew died, along with 40 of the 55 passengers. The crash destroyed five houses and damaged three others, killing two people on the ground. Survivors credited the heroic actions of stewardesses who called out to survivors to exit through a hole in the rear of the plane.

Investigation

The National Transportation Safety Board (NTSB) was notified of the accident at 14:40 CST and immediately dispatched an investigation team to the scene. Agents of the Federal Bureau of Investigation (FBI) were on the scene about 45 minutes after the crash, before any investigators from the NTSB.

The Flight Data Recorder (FDR) on board the aircraft was not functioning at the time of the crash due to a mechanical failure. Fortunately, the ARTS-III (Automated Terminal Radar Services) system at nearby O'Hare International Airport was in operation at the time of the accident, and saved recorded transponder data on magnetic tape. The tapes were analyzed extensively and compared to Boeing flight profile data to develop the course, speed, rate of descent, and altitudes of the plane as it made its approach to Chicago Midway.<ref
    name="Rpt" />

The Cockpit Voice Recorder (CVR) was working normally and the tape in that "black box" was relatively undamaged, which enabled the NTSB to sequence it in time with the readings of ARTS-III. The NTSB then was able to determine the power output of the engines, at any given point in time, with CVR tape sound analysis.  That correlation, CVR with ARTS-III, allowed the NTSB to reconstruct the flight's performance, and to determine that the stick shaker first sounded 6 to 7 seconds after the plane leveled off at  MSL ( AGL) and continued until ground impact.

The CVR showed cockpit discussion of the FDR fault
and it has since been reported as fact that the crew had become distracted by it.

At 14:27 the final-descent checklist was completed and the first officer then<ref
    name="Rpt" /> called out "thousand feet", apparently in reference to the plane's altitude reaching  MSL,<ref
    name="Rpt" />  According to the airline’s procedures, the First Officer should by then have been monitoring instruments, and calling out conformance to the specified descent profile, every .<ref
    name="Rpt"/>  A similar 1000 ft call and instrument check should have been made at a height above ground of 1000 ft (1000 AGL)<ref
    name="Rpt" /> but had been omitted.  Ground impact occurred at 14:28.

The NTSB sought to understand how the rapid descent had been accomplished.  From performance studies and simulator tests it was clear that the aircraft was in a high-drag configuration,<ref
    name="Rpt" /> rather than any of  the approach configurations specified<ref
    name="Rpt" /> by the airline, and the Board concluded that Flight 553 had landing gear down, flaps at 30 degrees and spoilers extended to the flight detent position.<ref
    name="Rpt" />  The status indicator for the spoilers would then be showing green: the same indication as for spoilers retracted but ready to deploy automatically immediately on landing, potentially misleading the First Officer when executing the final-descent checklist urgently.<ref
    name="Rpt" />  It was thus likely that when the Captain attempted to level off he failed to immediately retract the spoilers.<ref
    name="Rpt" />  The aircraft lost speed, and a stall began to develop.

Coincidentally,<ref
    name="Rpt" /> the Air Traffic Controller decided that the separation between Flight 553 and the slower aircraft ahead of it on the approach to the runway was no longer sufficient and instructed Flight 553 to go around for a missed approach.  This instruction was received on 553's radio as the aircraft's stall warning began.

The final mistake was inappropriate retraction of the flaps, from 30 degrees to 15 degrees, while the plane's airspeed was still too low and the spoilers were still extended. Flaps-15 was the correct configuration for the go-around, but not with spoilers deployed;<ref
    name="Rpt" /> and flap retraction is inappropriate with the stick shaker active because flap retraction increases the minimum speed for flight.

No evidence was found of sabotage or foul play.<ref
    name="Rpt" />  The NTSB Report stated that because of the "allegations of foul play which have been injected into the publicity surrounding this accident" it was "necessary to present certain aspects of the trauma experienced by nonsurvivors in more detail than would normally be reported".  The Board’s official finding of the probable cause of the accident was the captain’s failure to exercise positive flight management.

The Analysis section of the Report concludes with a paragraph to "emphasize"
that the accident sequence resulted from that failure, and "reiterate[d]
its often-expressed concern about the apparent lack of crew coordination and cockpit discipline during nonprecision approaches".  It went on to make comparison with the then-recent Eastern Air Lines hard landing at Fort Lauderdale and Southern Airways accident at Huntington Tri-State, and refers
the reader to the Report on the Southern Airways accident which quotes in full an FAA Bulletin raising issues of training and culture.

Conspiracy theories
Dorothy Hunt's death led to the accident becoming caught up in rumors and conspiracy theories related to the unfolding Watergate scandal. Hunt was carrying $10,000 in $100 bills when the plane crashed, and some alleged that this money was meant for people connected to Watergate. James McCord alleged that Hunt supplied the Watergate defendants with money for legal expenses.  The FBI's appearance at the crash scene was also regarded by some as unusually fast.  Skeptics of the official narrative speculated that the plane was targeted due to Hunt's presence on board, and that sabotage of the flight was covered up by government agencies.  As a result, the accident became known as "the Watergate crash."

Proponents of Watergate-related theories included Sherman Skolnick, a Chicago-based private investigator, who alleged that the aircraft had been sabotaged by the CIA. On June 13, 1973, Skolnick testified at an NTSB hearing in Rosemont, Illinois and claimed the Federal Bureau of Investigation, Columbia Broadcasting System, United Air Lines, traffic controllers at Midway, and the NTSB itself conspired in a plot to sabotage the flight because 12 of its passengers had links to Watergate. United Airlines officials had asked the NTSB to hear Skolnick's version because he had frequently charged that UAL was among those attempting to suppress his explanation of events. He said that Hunt carried $2 million in traveler's checks and money orders stolen from the Committee for the Re-Election of the President, $50,000 in currency, and documents that may have led to the impeachment of President Richard Nixon. He stated a hitman — that Nixon had placed aboard the aircraft to make sure that Hunt was killed — also died in the crash. The Chicago Tribune said that Skolnick "[knitted] scores of facts and assumptions together loosely" and "[no] documentation was produced to substantiate the charges".

The claim of CIA responsibility was echoed by Nixon's special counsel Chuck Colson in an interview with Time magazine in 1974.  However, the same article speculated that Colson was accusing the CIA of the broad Watergate conspiracy in a desperate attempt to stave off Nixon's impeachment in the scandal, and that Colson may have "lost touch with reality" as he faced a prison sentence.

Notes

References

External links
    Cockpit Voice Recorder transcript (at tailstrike.com)
  Note that tailstrike.com‘s accident summary is from this  Wikipedia article, as in December 2007, lightly copy-edited.
 FBI file on United Airlines Flight 553

Aviation accidents and incidents in the United States in 1972
December 1972 events in the United States
1972 in Illinois
1970s in Chicago
553
Airliner accidents and incidents in Illinois
Disasters in Illinois
Accidents and incidents involving the Boeing 737 Original
Airliner accidents and incidents caused by pilot error
Conspiracy theories involving aviation incidents
Midway International Airport
Watergate scandal